Colman is a city in Moody County, South Dakota, United States. The population was 634 at the 2020 census.

History
Colman was first named Allentown, and under the latter name got its start in 1890, following construction of the Milwaukee Railroad through the territory.

Geography
Colman is located at  (43.983633, -96.813349).

Colman has been assigned the ZIP code 57017 and the FIPS place code 13220.

Demographics

2010 census
As of the census of 2010, there were 594 people, 237 households, and 160 families residing in the city. The racial makeup of the city was 94.4% White, 0.3% African American, 1.7% Native American, 0.8% Asian, 0.8% from other races, and 1.9% from two or more races. Hispanic or Latino of any race were 1.7% of the population.

There were 237 households, of which 38.0% had children under the age of 18 living with them, 50.6% were married couples living together, 12.7% had a female householder with no husband present, 4.2% had a male householder with no wife present, and 32.5% were non-families. 29.5% of all households were made up of individuals, and 13.1% had someone living alone who was 65 years of age or older. The average household size was 2.51 and the average family size was 3.11.

The median age in the city was 35.7 years. 30.8% of residents were under the age of 18; 7.1% were between the ages of 18 and 24; 25.5% were from 25 to 44; 23% were from 45 to 64; and 13.8% were 65 years of age or older. The gender makeup of the city was 51.9% male and 48.1% female.

2000 census
As of the census of 2000, there were 572 people, 242 households, and 156 families residing in the city. The population density was 344.0 people per square mile (133.0/km2). There were 259 housing units at an average density of 155.7 per square mile (60.2/km2). The racial makeup of the city was 96.85% White, 0.35% Native American, 1.22% Asian, and 1.57% from two or more races. Hispanic or Latino of any race were 1.22% of the population.

There were 242 households, out of which 34.7% had children under the age of 18 living with them, 53.3% were married couples living together, 8.7% had a female householder with no husband present, and 35.5% were non-families. 32.2% of all households were made up of individuals, and 14.5% had someone living alone who was 65 years of age or older. The average household size was 2.36 and the average family size was 3.03.

In the city, the population was spread out, with 28.5% under the age of 18, 7.3% from 18 to 24, 30.6% from 25 to 44, 20.3% from 45 to 64, and 13.3% who were 65 years of age or older. The median age was 35 years. For every 100 females, there were 86.9 males. For every 100 females age 18 and over, there were 92.0 males.

The median income for a household in the city was $32,143, and the median income for a family was $44,000. Males had a median income of $32,212 versus $21,442 for females. The per capita income for the city was $16,772. About 6.1% of families and 7.7% of the population were below the poverty line, including 7.7% of those under age 18 and 7.2% of those age 65 or over.

References

Cities in South Dakota
Cities in Moody County, South Dakota